On May 7 and June 7, 2005, the city of San Antonio, Texas held an election to choose who would serve as Mayor of San Antonio for a two-year term to expire in 2007. Phil Hardberger won in a runoff against Julian Castro.

Polling

Primary election

General election

Results

Notes

References

21st century in San Antonio
2005 Texas elections
2005 United States mayoral elections
Julian Castro
2005
Non-partisan elections